Diana Baieva (born 2004) is a Ukrainian female rhythmic gymnast. She won two gold, one silver and one bronze medal at the 2020 European Championship.

References

External links 
 

2004 births
Living people
Ukrainian rhythmic gymnasts
Medalists at the Rhythmic Gymnastics European Championships
Sportspeople from Makiivka
21st-century Ukrainian women